Box Hill Hospital is a teaching hospital in Melbourne. It is one of the seven hospitals that are governed within the Eastern Health network which provides health care services across the Eastern metropolitan area of Victoria.

Established in 1956, Box Hill Hospital is a large acute hospital in the Melbourne suburb of Box Hill, which admits over 48,000 patients each year.

The hospital provides a wide range of healthcare services including: emergency care, general and specialist medicine, intensive care, mental health services for children, adolescents and adults, maternity services, post-acute care programs, surgery, teaching and research.

Box Hill Hospital is a university teaching hospital affiliated with Monash, La Trobe and Deakin Universities.

In 2016 Box Hill Hospital celebrated its 60th anniversary with a staff event.

Bunjil the Eagle 

Bunjil the Eagle, which stands 2.8 metres tall, creates a welcoming environment for Aboriginal patients, staff and their families inside Box Hill Hospital's new main entrance. Bunjil was carved from a sugar gum tree by renowned Aboriginal artist Glenn Romanis.

Maternity 

Located on Level 3 of the new 10-storey building, the service includes 10 birthing rooms (five with birthing baths), 31 post-natal beds, a special care nursery, foetal monitoring assessment area and outpatient clinics.

Emergency 

The new Emergency Department (entrance via Rodgerson Road) is open and the former Emergency Department (Nelson Road) is now closed.

History
The idea of a local hospital to serve the Box Hill area first surfaced around 1937, with a  site in Nelson Road being acquired from the Rodgerson estate in 1945. Construction started in early 1949 but because of funding issues the hospital did not open until April 1956. Its original name was the Box Hill and District Hospital.

Services
The Box Hill hospital provides the following services:
 Emergency care
 general and specialist medicine
 intensive care
 mental health services for children, adolescents and adults
 maternity services
 post acute care programs
 specialist surgery
 general, non-invasive, and interventional cardiology

Redevelopment project
Box Hill Hospital's new $448 million clinical services building was designed by Jackson Architecture in Association with Silver Thomas Hanley and opened by former Victorian Premier Denis Napthine in August 2014. The project was completed ahead of schedule. Patients were moved to the new building on 30 September 2014. The 10-storey Arnold St building houses the hospital's new emergency department, as well as maternity, cardiac and intensive care units. Box Hill Hospital's new 10-storey clinical services block (known as Building A) has been designed to accommodate future growth in Melbourne's east.

On 9 December 2009, the Victorian Labor government approved $407.5 million in funding for the redevelopment of the Box Hill Hospital. Plans for a new building to be constructed over the car park at the rear of the hospital and the Clive Ward building area were completed in 2014.

New facilities
 An increase of more than 200 beds
 A larger, more efficient emergency department
 A new 18-bed intensive care unit
 10 new operating theatres, with an 11th for future expansion 
 Improved women and children's services
 More inpatient and day beds for cancer and renal patients
 Two floors of basement parking to provide 212 spaces for community use.
The previous Box Hill Hospital building (known as Building B) has been refurbished to include:
 Thoroughfare between the two buildings, with a wide, contemporary open space on the ground floor connecting Building A to Building B
 Diagnostic cardiology with a direct link to the Cardiology inpatient unit in Building A
 A new contemporary endoscopy suite
 Refurbished specialist clinics

See also
 List of hospitals in Australia
 Healthcare in Australia

References

External links

Hospital buildings completed in 1956
Hospitals in Melbourne
Teaching hospitals in Australia
Hospitals established in 1956
1956 establishments in Australia
Buildings and structures in the City of Whitehorse